Jefferson is the primary hamlet and a census-designated place (CDP) within the town of Jefferson in Schoharie County, New York, United States. It was first listed as a CDP prior to the 2020 census.

Jefferson is in southwestern Schoharie County, in the center of the town of Jefferson. New York State Route 10 passes through the community, leading north  to Richmondville and south  to Stamford.

Demographics

References 

Census-designated places in Schoharie County, New York
Census-designated places in New York (state)